Medvedtsevo is a rural locality (a village) in Muromtsevskoye Rural Settlement, Sudogodsky District, Vladimir Oblast, Russia. The population was 2 as of 2010.

Geography 
Medvedtsevo is located on the Poboyka River, 14 km southwest of Sudogda (the district's administrative centre) by road. Volnaya Artemovka is the nearest rural locality.

References 

Rural localities in Sudogodsky District